KPUB (91.7 FM) is a radio station broadcasting a News Talk Information format. Licensed to Flagstaff, Arizona, United States, it serves the Flagstaff area.  The station is currently owned by Northern Arizona University and features programming from National Public Radio and Public Radio International.

The station signed on in 2001, and airs an extended schedule of NPR news and talk programming, including a number of programs that had never previously aired in northern Arizona before. It acts as a complement to the area's flagship NPR station, KNAU, which airs a mix of NPR news and classical music.

External links
 
 
 
 
 
 
 
 

PUB
NPR member stations
Radio stations established in 2001
2001 establishments in Arizona
PUB
Northern Arizona University